The 2019 Robert Morris Colonials football team will represent Robert Morris University during the 2019 NCAA Division I FCS football season. They will be led by second-year head coach Bernard Clark and play their home games at Joe Walton Stadium. They are a member of the Northeast Conference.

Previous season

The Colonials finished the 2018 season 2–9, 0–6 in NEC play to finish in last place.

Preseason

Preseason coaches' poll
The NEC released their preseason coaches' poll on July 24, 2019. The Colonials were picked to finish in seventh place.

Preseason All-NEC team
The Colonials had one player selected to the preseason all-NEC team.

Offense

Matthew Gonzalez – TE/HB

Schedule

Game summaries

at Buffalo

Kentucky State

Dayton

at VMI

at Youngstown State

at Saint Francis

at Wagner

Bryant

LIU

Duquesne

at Central Connecticut

Sacred Heart

References

Robert Morris
Robert Morris Colonials football seasons
Robert Morris Colonials football